Vladimir Letnicov (born 7 October 1981 in Chişinău) is a Moldovan triple jumper. His personal best jump is 17.06 metres, achieved in June 2002 in Belgrade.

He finished ninth at the 2003 World Indoor Championships and eighth at the 2005 Summer Universiade. He also competed at the 2000 World Junior Championships, the 2002 European Championships, the 2005 European Indoor Championships as well as the Olympic Games in 2004 and 2008, but failed to qualify for the final round.

Competition record

References
sports-reference

1981 births
Living people
Sportspeople from Chișinău
Moldovan male triple jumpers
Olympic male triple jumpers
Olympic athletes of Moldova
Athletes (track and field) at the 2004 Summer Olympics
Athletes (track and field) at the 2008 Summer Olympics
Athletes (track and field) at the 2016 Summer Olympics
European Games competitors for Moldova
Athletes (track and field) at the 2015 European Games
Universiade bronze medalists for Moldova
Universiade medalists in athletics (track and field)
World Athletics Championships athletes for Moldova
Medalists at the 2009 Summer Universiade